The 1948–49 season was the 69th season of competitive football in England.

Overview
Portsmouth won the First Division title for the first time with a team of no recognised stars and very few international players. However, it was not the first major honour for the Hampshire club, as they had been the last winners of the FA Cup before the outbreak of the war. They would retain their league title the following season.

Wolverhampton Wanderers, under manager Stan Cullis and captain Billy Wright, won their first major trophy for more than 40 years when they beat Leicester City 3-1 in the final of the FA Cup. This was the beginning of a great run of success for the West Midlands side.

Honours

Notes = Number in parentheses is the times that club has won that honour. * indicates new record for competition

Football League

First Division

Second Division

Third Division North

Third Division South

Top goalscorers

First Division
Willie Moir (Bolton Wanderers) – 25 goals

Second Division
Charlie Wayman (Southampton) – 32 goals

Third Division North
Wally Ardron (Rotherham United) – 29 goals

Third Division South
Doug McGibbon (Bournemouth & Boscombe Athletic) – 30 goals

References